Mornico Losana is a comune (municipality) in the Province of Pavia in the Italian region Lombardy, located about 50 km south of Milan and about 20 km south of Pavia. As of 31 December 2020, it had a population of 600 

and an area of 8.2 km².

Mornico Losana borders the following municipalities: Montalto Pavese, Oliva Gessi, Pietra de' Giorgi, Santa Giuletta, Torricella Verzate.

Demographic evolution

References

Cities and towns in Lombardy